Paul Neff (born 10 January 1938) is a German wrestler. He competed at the 1960 Summer Olympics, the 1964 Summer Olympics and the 1968 Summer Olympics.

References

External links
 

1938 births
Living people
German male sport wrestlers
Olympic wrestlers of the United Team of Germany
Olympic wrestlers of West Germany
Wrestlers at the 1960 Summer Olympics
Wrestlers at the 1964 Summer Olympics
Wrestlers at the 1968 Summer Olympics
Sportspeople from Rhineland-Palatinate